António Rodrigues Sampaio (São Bartolomeu do Mar, Esposende, 25 July 1806 — Sintra, 13 September 1882) was a Portuguese politician and the President of the Council of Ministers from 25 March to 14 November 1881.

References

1806 births
1882 deaths
People from Esposende
Regenerator Party politicians
Prime Ministers of Portugal
19th-century Portuguese people